Leptinillus is a genus of mammal-nest beetles in the family Leiodidae. There are at least 2 described species in Leptinillus.

Species
 Leptinillus aplodontiae Ferris, 1918
 Leptinillus validus (Horn, 1872) (beaver nest beetle)

References

 Majka C, Langor D (2008). "The Leiodidae (Coleoptera) of Atlantic Canada: new records, faunal composition, and zoogeography". ZooKeys 2: 357–402.
 Peck, Stewart B. (2007). "Distribution and biology of the ectoparasitic beetles Leptinillus validus (Horn) and L. aplodontiae Ferris of North America (Coleoptera: Leiodidae: Platypsyllinae)". Insecta Mundi, no. 0003, 1–7.
 Peck, Stewart B. / Arnett, Ross H. Jr. and Michael C. Thomas, eds. (2001). "Family 19. Leiodidae Fleming, 1821". American Beetles, vol. 1: Archostemata, Myxophaga, Adephaga, Polyphaga: Staphyliniformia, 250–258.

Further reading

 Arnett, R. H. Jr., M. C. Thomas, P. E. Skelley and J. H. Frank. (eds.). (21 June 2002). American Beetles, Volume II: Polyphaga: Scarabaeoidea through Curculionoidea. CRC Press LLC, Boca Raton, Florida .
 Arnett, Ross H. (2000). American Insects: A Handbook of the Insects of America North of Mexico. CRC Press.
 Richard E. White. (1983). Peterson Field Guides: Beetles. Houghton Mifflin Company.

Leiodidae